Lawrence Academy at Groton is a private, nonsectarian, coeducational college preparatory boarding school located in Groton, Massachusetts, in the United States. Founded in 1792 by a group of fifty residents of Groton and Pepperell, Massachusetts as Groton Academy, and chartered in 1793 by Governor John Hancock, Lawrence is the tenth oldest boarding school in the United States, and the third in Massachusetts, following Governor Dummer Academy (1763) and Phillips Academy at Andover (1778). The phrase on Lawrence Academy's seal is "Omnibus Lucet": in Latin, "Let light shine upon all."

History
On April 27, 1792, residents of the towns of Groton and Pepperell, Massachusetts, influenced by the growing "academy movement" in the young republic, which sought to provide a broader and more practical education than that available in the traditional Latin Grammar Schools, formed an association "for the purpose of erecting a suitable building, and supporting an Academy for superior educational purposes at Groton, Massachusetts." The association received its charter from  Governor John Hancock on September 28, 1793. Originally, the school was called Groton Academy, but was later changed to honor the Lawrence family.

For the academy's first schoolmaster, the trustees selected Samuel Holyoke, a prominent composer. He was a graduate of Phillips Academy and Harvard college.

The trustees announced the opening of their academy with an advertisement in the May 25, 1793 edition of the Columbian Centinel, a Boston newspaper; this was somewhat premature, as the charter was not secured for another four months. 

The advertisement expressed the values of the academy movement, reading in part:
This is to give notice, that a Public School is now opened in Groton, for the education of youth, of both sexes—in which School are taught the English, Latin and Greek Languages, Writing, Arithmetic, Geography, the Art of Speaking and Writing, with Practical Geometry, and Logic.

Classes commenced in 1794, with an enrollment of seventy-three students, primarily from Groton and the surrounding towns. Some, such as Thomas and Wyriott Alderson of Bath, North Carolina, came from farther afield.

In 1838, alumnus Amos Lawrence, a son of founder Samuel Lawrence and a prominent Boston merchant and industrialist, began his patronage of the Academy with a gift of "books and philosophical apparatus," followed in 1839 by "a telescope and Bowditch's translation of Mécanique Céleste by Laplace," and $2,000 for enlarging the schoolhouse in 1842. In 1844, Amos's brother William donated $10,000 to the school's endowment "for the advancement of education for all coming time."

By 1850, the school's library, established with a purchase of 86 new books in 1828, comprised 2,650 volumes, of which 2,400 were gifts of Amos Lawrence.

Over the course of their lives, Amos and William Lawrence donated a total of nearly $65,000 in cash, scholarships, and property to the school (roughly equivalent to $1.83 million in 2013 dollars). In recognition of their significant generosity, Groton Academy petitioned the Massachusetts legislature in 1845 to change the school's name to honor their benefactors. On February 28, 1846, Governor George N. Briggs signed into law an act formally changing the corporate name of "The Trustees of the Groton Academy" to "The Trustees of the Lawrence Academy at Groton."

Between 1801 and 1870, Lawrence Academy contributed fifty students to Harvard College and placed among the dozen schools which supplied the greatest number of students to Cambridge. As the 19th century progressed and more schools catering to the children of the elite ranks of Boston merchants and industrialists were established closer to Boston, that position gradually waned. The Academy also enjoyed close ties to other New England liberal arts colleges — particularly Dartmouth and Williams College — which themselves catered to the region's "older
provincial elite". The gifts of the Lawrence brothers established four scholarships each for students to attend Williams College, Bowdoin College in Maine, and Wabash College in Indiana. Franklin Carter, president of Williams College, was the guest speaker at the academy's 90th anniversary celebration in 1883.

In 1868, during a Fourth of July celebration, an errantly tossed firecracker burned Lawrence Academy's main schoolhouse to the ground. By soliciting "subscriptions," the building was replaced in 1869 at a cost of $24,000 (more than $406,874 in 2013).

In 1956, amidst commencement exercises, fire once again destroyed Lawrence Academy's academic and administrative buildings. Following both fires, Lawrence Academy rebuilt; however, because of these incidents, it encountered financial difficulties through parts of the twentieth century, until the late 1970s. Lawrence was coeducational until 1898, when it switched to a boys-only student body. It remained single sex until 1971.

Student life

Campus 
Lawrence Academy is seated upon  of rolling countryside, in Groton, Massachusetts, thirty-one miles northwest of Boston, eight miles south of New Hampshire. Architecturally, Lawrence's campus features a mix of historic Federalist-Era houses and Neo-Georgian academic buildings. From Lawrence's central quadrangle, one can see the outline of Mount Wachusett to the west, the pastures of Gibbet Hill Farm, (the site of colonial gallows and The Castle), to the north, and the fairways of the Groton Country Club to the east.

Traditions
Annually, new students travel to Windsor, New Hampshire to a summer camp at the beginning of orientation for icebreaking and team building activities. Shortly following the start of classes, the entire student body hikes up Mount Monadnock in Jaffrey, New Hampshire, carrying on a 150-year old Lawrence tradition. Toward the end of the fall trimester, the student body and the faculty engages in a campus-wide game of tag called "Spoonhunt" for roughly a week in between classes. Students are given the names of their "targets" on the inside of a spoon, and they must catch this individual outside of an academic building during school hours. Lawrence Academy continues a half-century tradition of the annual Winterim, an experiential learning course in the first two weeks of March. Students travel domestically and internationally on service trips or research studies, to the Galapagos, the Dominican Republic, and the Orlando-based Give Kids The World Village for two weeks.

Facilities 
There are nine dorms on Lawrence Academy's campus, four for boys and five for girls. Dorms range in size from eight to forty-six students. There is also a dining hall and student center for all students, boarding and day. The admissions department, administrative offices, science laboratories, and school store are located in the Schoolhouse Building at the center of campus. A majority of classes (English, History, Mathematics, Foreign Languages) are held in the Ansin Academic Building, off of the central quadrangle. The library is centrally located also along the quadrangle, and it connects to the Gray Building (dining hall) through the Williams Art Center which houses the 500 seat performing arts venue, multiple classrooms, and two blackbox theatres. Across campus, the Stone Athletic Center and the Grant Rink serve as venues for athletic events and practices throughout the year.

Affiliations
Lawrence Academy is directed by a self-perpetuating Board of Trustees. It is accredited by the New England Association of Schools and Colleges and the New England Preparatory School Athletic Council. Lawrence Academy has over 3,800 active alumni. The school competes within the Independent School League, with seventeen other academically rigorous and athletically competitive boarding and day schools throughout New England.

Enrollment
Each year Lawrence Academy enrolls approximately one hundred new students, approximately fifty of whom are boarding students. As of 2019, students hail from fifteen U.S. States and nineteen countries. The student-to-teacher ratio at Lawrence is approximately 5:1, with an average class size of 14 students. Tuition for the 2019-2020 academic year was $65,925 for boarders, $52,450 for day students. Thirty percent of students receive financial aid to attend. Lawrence accepts approximately 30% of applicants.

Athletics
Lawrence Academy's athletic teams compete in the Independent School League.

Notable alumni

 Tim Armstrong, class of 1989, chairman and CEO of AOL LLC
 Laurie Baker, class of 1995, 1998 Olympic gold medalist in women's hockey and 1992 silver medalist
 William Bancroft, 1st President of the Boston Elevated Railway, member of Massachusetts House of Representatives and mayor of Cambridge, Massachusetts
 Jonah Bayliss, relief pitcher for Kansas City Royals 2005 and Pittsburgh Pirates 2006 and '07.
 Charles Beecher,  minister, composer of hymns, and author.
 Tyler Beede, 2014 College World Series champion Vanderbilt University; drafted twice as pitcher in the MLB draft first round, and pitches for the San Francisco Giants
 Henry Adams Bullard, U.S. Representative from Louisiana 1831-1834 and 1850-1851
 Richard Burgin, author, editor of Boulevard
 Karyn Bryant, television personality; MTV VJ, CNN anchor
 Jim Campbell '91, former professional hockey player
 Guillermo Cantú, former professional footballer and football executive
 Bruce Crane, businessman and politician who was president and chairman of Crane & Co. and a member of the Massachusetts Governor's Council
 Greg Crozier, Two-time NCAA hockey champion from Michigan (1996 and 1998)
 James Dana, 5th mayor of Charlestown, Massachusetts
 A. J. Dillon, American football running back for the Green Bay Packers, second round pick in the 2020 NFL Draft.
 Doug Friedman, professional ice hockey player
 Eric Gaskins, fashion designer based in New York City
 Samuel Abbott Green, physician, librarian, historian, and 28th Mayor of Boston
 Donald L. Harlow, Chief Master Sergeant of the Air Force
 Edward D. Hayden, U.S. Representative from Massachusetts
 Steve Heinze '88, Olympian in men's hockey and former NHL player for Boston Bruins and LA Kings
 Frederick "Moose" Heyliger, World War II paratrooper featured in Band of Brothers
 Vic Heyliger, U.S. Hockey Hall of Fame inductee; University of Michigan All-American and later coach of six NCAA champions at Michigan; also coached Illinois, Air Force Academy and the U.S. National Hockey Team
 Chase Hoyt,  film, television, and stage actor
 David Jensen, class of 1984, '84 Olympian in hockey and former NHL player with Hartford Whalers and Washington Capitals
 Amos Kendall, 8th Postmaster General and founder of Gallaudet College for the deaf
 Abbott Lawrence, Member of Congress; Minister to Great Britain; founder of Harvard University's Division of Engineering and Applied Sciences
 Amos Adams Lawrence, abolitionist; politician; founder of the University of Kansas, Lawrence University, and co-founder of the Groton School
 Amos Lawrence, industrialist; philanthropist
 Charles H. Mansur, member of the U.S. House of Representatives from Missouri
 Cat Marnell, writer 
 Julie Mason, newspaper and radio journalist
 Page McConnell, Phish musician
 Audrey A. McNiff, managing director at Goldman Sachs
 Shabazz Napier, former NBA basketball player
 Albert E. Pillsbury, President of the Massachusetts State Senate and Massachusetts Attorney General
 William Adams Richardson, 29th Secretary of the Treasury and Chief Justice of the United States Court of Claims
 Richard Roby, professional basketball player
 Maria Rodale, publisher; Chairman and CEO of Rodale, Inc.
 Cynthia Ryder, 1992 Olympic sculler
 Jeff Serowik '86, former professional hockey player
 Ether Shepley, politician; Senator from Maine from 1833-1835, Chief Justice of the Maine Supreme Judicial Court 1848-1855
 Jim Sokolove, television attorney
 Huntley N. Spaulding, philanthropist; Governor of New Hampshire from 1927 to 1929
 Charles Warren Stone, politician; Congressman and Lieutenant Governor from Pennsylvania
 Frank Bigelow Tarbell, historian, archeologist and professor at University of Chicago
 George Makepeace Towle, lawyer, politician, and author
 Dr. James Walker, Unitarian minister and 21st president of Harvard University
 William B. Washburn, Governor of Massachusetts from 1872-1874, U.S. Representative from 1863-1871, U.S. Senator from 1874-1875
 Fritz Wetherbee, Emmy Award-winning television personality
 William Channing Whitney, architect
 Antoine Wright, former NBA basketball player

Notable faculty
 Samuel Adams Holyoke, first headmaster
 Robert V. Bruce, 1988 winner of the Pulitzer Prize for History
 Brian Feigenbaum, founder of Food Not Bombs
 Paul Zukauskas, former Boston College football and Cleveland Browns player who coached at Lawrence Academy, leading the team to four consecutive ISL and two additional NEPSAC championships

References

Further reading

External links
 
 The Association of Boarding Schools profile
 Lawrence Academy profile at Petersons.
 Gibbet Hill history.
  
 Lawrence Academy on Instagram. Archived from the original on ghostarchive.org

1793 establishments in Massachusetts
Boarding schools in Massachusetts
Buildings and structures in Groton, Massachusetts
Co-educational boarding schools
Education in Groton, Massachusetts
Educational institutions established in 1793
Independent School League
National Register of Historic Places in Middlesex County, Massachusetts
Private high schools in Massachusetts
Private preparatory schools in Massachusetts
School buildings on the National Register of Historic Places in Massachusetts
Schools in Middlesex County, Massachusetts